The Principality of Mingrelia, also known as Odishi and as Samegrelo, was a historical state in Georgia ruled by the Dadiani dynasty.

History 
The principality emerged out of a non-aggression pact and an ensuing treaty signed by Konstantine II of Kartli, Alexandre of Kakhetia, and Qvarqvare II, atabag of Samtshke, which divided Georgia into three kingdoms and a number of principalities. Mingrelia was established as an independent Principality in 1557 with Levan I Dadiani serving as a hereditary mtavari (Prince). It remained independent until it became a subject to Imperial Russia in 1803. This came after it signed a patronage treaty with the Russian Empire, which was concluded in return for Russian protection against the harassment of Mingrelia's more powerful neighbors, Imeretia and Abkhazia. The principality ultimately came to an end when Prince Niko Dadiani was deposed, and the principality abolished, by Russia in 1867. Prince Niko officially renounced his rights to the throne in 1868 and the state became a Russian district until 1917.

See also
Samegrelo
Odishi
Salipartiano
Bediani
List of Princes of Mingrelia

References 

Former countries in Europe
Former principalities of Georgia (country)
Russian Empire
States and territories established in 1557
1557 establishments in Europe
1557 establishments in Asia
Tributary states of the Ottoman Empire